The Wicked Earl is a 1927 comedy play by the British-American writer Walter C. Hackett. A British earl travels to New Mexico to find out more about his heritage.

It ran for 31 performances at His Majesty's Theatre in London's West End. The original cast included Cyril Maude, Alfred Drayton, Marion Lorne, Joyce Kennedy, Stella Arbenina, George Bellamy, O.B. Clarence and Sam Livesey.

References

Bibliography

 Wearing, J.P. The London Stage 1920-1929: A Calendar of Productions, Performers, and Personnel. Rowman & Littlefield, 2014.

1927 plays
West End plays
Comedy plays
Plays by Walter C. Hackett